The Mediapolis Community School District, or Mediapolis Schools, is a rural public school district headquartered in Mediapolis, Iowa.  It is mostly within Des Moines County, with a small area in Louisa County, and serves the city of Mediapolis and the surrounding rural areas.
 

Greg Ray has been the superintendent since 2009. Incumbent Superintendent Adam Magliari will start in June 2023.

Schools
The district operates three schools, all in single facility in Mediapolis classified as Mediapolis CSD:
 Mediapolis Elementary School
 Mediapolis Middle School
 Mediapolis High School

Mediapolis High School

Athletics
The Bulldogs and Bullettes compete in the Southeast Iowa Superconference in the following sports:
Cross Country
Volleyball
Football
Wrestling
Basketball
 Girls 2-time State Champions (1967, 1973) 
Track and Field
Golf
Soccer
Baseball
Softball

See also
List of school districts in Iowa
List of high schools in Iowa

References

External links
 Mediapolis Community School District

School districts in Iowa
Education in Louisa County, Iowa
Education in Des Moines County, Iowa